"Nothing in This World" is a song by Australian rock band Taxiride. It was released as the band's fourth and final single from their debut #1 album, Imaginate in July 2000 becoming the band's fourth top fifty single.

Track listing
CD single
 "Nothing in This World" – 3:27	
 "Helena My Dear" – 4:01	
 "Can You Feel" (live) – 3:28	
 "Can You Feel" (Leigh Brothers Remix) – 3:30	
 "Nothing in This World" (Secret Sound Mix) – 3:25

Charts

References

2000 singles
Taxiride songs
1999 songs
Warner Records singles
Song recordings produced by Jack Joseph Puig